The America's Cup class may refer to any yacht-building rule or any group of racing yachts that were built for the America's Cup sailing competition, including:

Deed of Gift of the America's Cup, a document that governed America's Cup in 1988 and 2010 without a class
Cubical Contents rule, tonnage and handicap rule for displacement yachts that governed the America's Cup from 1870 to 1881
NYYC rule, formula and handicap rule for displacement yachts that governed the America's Cup from 1885 to 1887 (85 ft LWL limit)
Seawanhaka Rule, formula and handicap rule for displacement yachts that governed the America's Cup in 1893 (85 ft LWL limit) and from 1895 to 1903 (90 ft LWL limit)
Universal Rule, formula rule for displacement yachts that governed the America's Cup in 1920 (75 ft LWL limit) and from 1930 to 1937 (J Class 87 ft LWL limit)
12-metre class, formula rule for displacement yachts that governed the America's Cup from 1958 to 1987
International America's Cup Class, formula rule for displacement yachts that governed the America's Cup from 1992 to 2007
AC72, development class of winged catamarans that governed the 2013 America's Cup
AC50, development class of winged catamarans that governed the 2017 America's Cup
AC75, development class of hydrofoiling monohulls that governed the 2021 America's Cup and which are planned to be used for the 37th America's Cup and 38th America's Cup matches.

See also
America's Cup (disambiguation)

America's Cup